is a railway station in the town of Izumozaki, Santō District, Niigata Prefecture, Japan, operated by East Japan Railway Company (JR East).

Lines
Oginojō Station is served by the Echigo Line and is 22.7 kilometers from the terminus of the line at Kashiwazaki Station.

Station layout
The station consists of a single ground-level side platform serving one bi-directional track. There is no station  building, but only a waiting room on the platform.

The station is unattended. Suica farecard cannot be used at this station.

History
Oginojō Station opened on 25 June 1958. With the privatization of Japanese National Railways (JNR) on 1 April 1987, the station came under the control of JR East.

Surrounding area

See also
 List of railway stations in Japan

References

External links

 JR East station information 

Railway stations in Niigata Prefecture
Railway stations in Japan opened in 1958
Echigo Line
Stations of East Japan Railway Company
Izumozaki, Niigata